Bohdan "Don" Domansky (born August 11, 1946 in Ulm, Germany) is a retired track and field athlete, who represented Canada at two Summer Olympics (1968 and 1976), two British Commonwealth Games (1966 and 1970) and two Pan Am Games in 1967 and 1975 in the 400 metres and the 4x400 metre relay.  He won medals at the British Commonwealth Games (silver 1966 4x400 metre relay, bronze in 1966 400 metres), medals at the Pan Am Games (silver in 1975 4x400 metre relay, bronze in 1967 400 metres) and achieved a 4th in the 4x400 metres in the Olympics in 1976.  As member of the UCLA (University of California, Los Angeles) Don was a team NCAA champion, 4x400 metre NCAA champion and was a world record holder in the 440 yard relay in 1966.   He held the Canadian individual open record in the 400 metres from 1967 to 1977 and helped set the Canadian 4x400 metre record in 1976 which still stands today.  Track and Field News ranked him 4th in the world in the 400 metres in 1967.  His fastest performance was a 44.3 400 metre relay split in the 1966 British Commonwealth Games.

References

1946 births
Living people
Sportspeople from Ulm
Canadian male sprinters
Athletes (track and field) at the 1966 British Empire and Commonwealth Games
Athletes (track and field) at the 1967 Pan American Games
Athletes (track and field) at the 1968 Summer Olympics
Athletes (track and field) at the 1970 British Commonwealth Games
Athletes (track and field) at the 1975 Pan American Games
Athletes (track and field) at the 1976 Summer Olympics
Olympic track and field athletes of Canada
Pan American Games silver medalists for Canada
Pan American Games bronze medalists for Canada
Pan American Games medalists in athletics (track and field)
Commonwealth Games silver medallists for Canada
Commonwealth Games bronze medallists for Canada
Commonwealth Games medallists in athletics
Canadian people of Ukrainian descent
UCLA Bruins men's track and field athletes
Medalists at the 1967 Pan American Games
Medalists at the 1975 Pan American Games
20th-century Canadian people
21st-century Canadian people
Medallists at the 1966 British Empire and Commonwealth Games